Trochiloleskia is a genus of bristle flies in the family Tachinidae. There are at least two described species in Trochiloleskia.

Species
These two species belong to the genus Trochiloleskia:
 Trochiloleskia flava Townsend, 1917
 Trochiloleskia loriola (Reinhard, 1955)

References

Further reading

External links

 
 

Tachininae